John Fulmer Bright (November 17, 1877 – December 29, 1953) was an American politician and physician.

Bright received an M.D. from the Medical College of Virginia in 1898. He sat in the Virginia House of Delegates representing the city of Richmond in 1922.

Bright served as mayor of Richmond 1924–1940. As mayor, He believed in limited government and frequently vetoed development projects. He also opposed the federal housing program during the Great Depression. Largely in response to the way he had used his veto power, in 1948 a new city charter weakened the mayor's power by implementing a city manager system and replaced the bicameral city council with a single nine-person body whose members were elected at large.

Bright died of heart disease on December 29, 1953, and was buried in Hollywood Cemetery, in Richmond.

See also
List of mayors of Richmond, Virginia

References
Robert C. Glass and Carter Glass Jr., Virginia Democracy (1937), 3:108–109.
John T. Kneebone et al., eds., Dictionary of Virginia Biography (1998-  ), 2:231-233. 
Christopher Silver, Twentieth-Century Richmond: Planning, Politics, and Race (1984), 90–93, 130–131, 146–150, 176–181, 188–189.
Obituaries in Richmond News Leader and Richmond Times-Dispatch, both 30 Dec. 1953.

Mayors of Richmond, Virginia
1877 births
1923 deaths
Physicians from Virginia
Medical College of Virginia alumni